Ivatt is a surname. Notable persons with that name include:

 Henry Ivatt (1851–1923), English railway engineer, Chief Mechanical Engineer of the Great Northern Railway
 George Ivatt (1886–1976), Irish railway engineer, Chief Mechanical Engineer of the London Midland and Scottish Railway, son of the above

See also